The rail network in Queensland, Australia, was the first in the world to adopt  narrow gauge for a main line, and now the second largest narrow gauge network in the world, consists of:

the North Coast Line (NCL) extending  from Brisbane to Rockhampton, Townsville and Cairns
Four east–west lines (and associated branch lines) connecting to the NCL:
the Western line (including the Main Line) from Brisbane to Toowoomba and Charleville
the Central Western line from Rockhampton to Longreach and Winton
the Great Northern Railway from Townsville to Mount Isa
the Tablelands line from Cairns to Atherton and Forsayth
Four export coal networks:
Moura to Gladstone
Blackwater to Gladstone utilising the Central Western and NCL lines
Goonyella to Hay Point
 Newlands to Abbot Point
the original narrow-gauge Southern line that provided a rail connection to Sydney, extending from Toowoomba to the New South Wales border at Wallangarra, plus the South Western line west from Warwick to Thallon;
Two lines extending south of Brisbane, a  narrow gauge passenger line from Brisbane to the Gold Coast, and a  line to the New South Wales border connecting to the line to Sydney
the isolated Normanton to Croydon line, now operated as a tourist service as The Gulflander
An isolated   private freight line at Weipa hauling bauxite from a mine to the export terminal; and
Over 3,000 km of  gauge sugar cane lines servicing 19 sugar mills (see Tramways section below).

Passenger services are provided by:
Long distance trains from:
Brisbane to Cairns
Townsville to Mount Isa
Brisbane to Rockhampton and Longreach
Brisbane to Charleville
Brisbane to Sydney by the standard gauge XPT
the Brisbane-centric TransLink network providing services:
south to Beenleigh and Varsity Lakes on the Gold Coast
north to Ferny Grove, Shorncliffe, Kippa-Ring, Caboolture and Gympie;
east to the Brisbane Airport and Doomben on the north side of the Brisbane River and to Cleveland on the south side of the river; and
west to Ipswich, Springfield and Rosewood.
The TransLink network consists of approximately 300 route km and 151 stations.

History

Construction

Construction of the Queensland rail network began in 1864 with the first section of the Main Line railway from Ipswich  to Grandchester being built. This was the first narrow-gauge main line constructed in the world  and is now the second largest narrow-gauge railway network in the world.

Network extent
At its maximum extent in 1932, the system totalled ~10,500 km of routes open for traffic.

In 1925 QR employed ~18,000 people, 713 locomotives, 930 passenger carriages, ~16,000 goods wagons, hauled ~five million tons of goods and ~30 million passengers, and made a return on capital of 3.2% before depreciation.

Electrification

Three significant electrification programs have been undertaken in Queensland which include the Brisbane suburban network, the Blackwater and Goonyella coal networks, and the Caboolture to Gladstone section of the North Coast line.

Public float

On 2 June 2009 the Queensland Government announced the 'Renewing Queensland Plan', with Queensland Rail's commercial activities to be separated from the Government's core passenger service responsibilities. The commercial activities were formed into a new company called QR National Limited. The new structure was announced by the Queensland Government on 2 December 2009, and took place from 1 July 2010.

Infrastructure

Track gauge

A prototype existed in Norway, but Queensland became the first rail operator in the world to adopt narrow gauge for a main line. The maximum gradient was 1 in 50 (2%) uncompensated, which combined with a  radius curve gives an equivalent grade of 1 in 41 (~2.5%).

One of main advantages of a narrow gauge railway is that the earthworks required during construction do not have to be as extensive. It was estimated that the cost of this standard of railway would be 25% of the cost of a standard gauge line built to the minimum standard considered possible with that gauge at the time. As the colony of Queensland had a non-indigenous population of ~30,000 at the time the decision was made, it is understandable. Standard gauge branch lines were later constructed in NSW with  radius curves and had the same low maximum speed.

The choice of the non-standard  gauge was and still is controversial, and the choice was approved very narrowly by parliament. Thus the die was cast for a large narrow-gauge system, which was copied by three other Australian states as well as a number of other countries. Queensland's decision to use narrow gauge was influential on New Zealand's decision to adopt narrow gauge as its uniform gauge in 1870.

A hundred and fifty years later, Queensland is still sparsely populated (5 million in 2018), but many trains hauling coal are some of the longest and heaviest in the world, with Aurizon currently trialing coal trains of 25,000 tonne gross load that are ~4.5 km long.

Rack railway 
QR had one rack railway, with grades as steep as 1 in 16.5 (6%), which was on the branch to Mount Morgan. It was bypassed by a conventional line in 1951 with grades of 1 in 50 (2%). The bypass closed in 1987. The rack system was the Abt rack system, the same type used by the Mount Lyell Railway in Tasmania.

Operators

Historically, the government-owned Queensland Rail has been the main rail operator in Queensland. The exception has been the standard-gauge link from New South Wales into Brisbane. When opened in 1930, it was operationally a part of the New South Wales system and run by that government-owned railway, under agreement with Queensland which owned the line. From 1994, National Rail took over the operation of virtually all standard-gauge freight services to and from Brisbane, as part of a reorganisation of interstate freight in Australia.

In 2002, QR entered the standard-gauge market through subsidiary Interail, by 2004, it was running freight services from Brisbane through to Melbourne. Today, standard-gauge freight services are operated by Pacific National after its acquisition of National Rail, and Aurizon (formerly a Queensland Rail subsidiary, QR National).

On the narrow gauge, Queensland Rail operates all passenger services. In 2005, the first non-QR narrow gauge commercial rail operation started in Queensland, with Pacific National commencing operation of container services between Brisbane and Cairns, followed in 2009 by their entry into the export coal market. Queensland Rail's subsidiary Australian Railroad Group have also entered the Queensland narrow-gauge freight market, operating trains between Townsville and Mount Isa in its own right. Standard-gauge passenger services are provided by the New South Wales Government's NSW TrainLink using its XPT.

Airtrain
The Airport railway line opened to passengers in May 2001. Under a BOOT scheme – build, own, operate and transfer – the Queensland Government licensed Airtrain Citylink to build the rail line, to own and operate it, and hand the entire infrastructure over to the Queensland Government after 35 years when the company will then cease to exist. Airtrain Citylink contracted Transfield Services to build, operate and maintain the line and finally Airtrain Citylink contracted Queensland Rail to provide rolling stock for the rail line.

Aurizon
In 2010, the Queensland government privatised the narrow gauge freight haulage and all standard gauge components of Queensland National. In 2012, the organisation renamed itself Aurizon.

Pacific National 
In March 2005, Pacific National Queensland became the first non-Queensland Rail narrow gauge commercial rail operation in Queensland, with the commencement of container services between Brisbane and Cairns. They now operate intermodal services to various destinations along the coast of Queensland. In 2018 they became responsible for sugar haulage in Central and North Queensland.

Watco Australia 
On 16 August 2019, Watco Australia announced that the first two of eight WRA Class locomotives units were being delivered to Australia. The company have stated that they would begin operations in the fourth quarter of 2019. WRA001 and 002 arrived at the Port of Brisbane on the vessel Tarago on 9 October 2019 and were transferred to Warwick behind QR locomotive 1724.

BHP Mitsubishi Alliance
BHP Mitsubishi Alliance (BMA) is a 50/50 partnership between the two named companies, operating 9 coal mines in the Bowen Basin. BMA Rail was authorised to operate on the Goonyella coal network from 1 January 2014, and purchased 13 Siemens E40 AG-V1 electric locomotives, designated as the BMACC class, numbered BMACC001-BMACC013. It has the potential to operate its own trains if contract haulage rates from either Aurizon or Pacific National are unacceptable.

Tramways

Non sugar cane tramways covered by their own entries are:
Aramac Tramway
Ballara Tramway
Beaudesert Shire Tramway
Belmont Tramway
Buderim Tramway
Cooloola Tramway
Innisfail Tramway
Laheys Tramway
Mapleton Tramway
Mill Point Settlement Site
Stannary Hills Tramways
Munro Tramway

Sugar cane tramways were usually developed in conjunction with sugar mills as the major transport system for conveying harvested sugar cane for processing. As this is a seasonal traffic, minimising cost was a significant consideration, and the adoption of  gauge enabled lines to be laid with minimal earthworks, sharp curves, and sometimes temporarily in cane fields so cut cane can be loaded directly onto wagons.

History

The first recorded use of a locomotive hauled tramway for sugar cane transport in Queensland was at a plantation at Morayfield (now an outer suburb of Brisbane) in 1866 using  gauge. The plantation was not a success, however another tramway built at Maryborough in the same year was successful.

A  gauge tramway was established at the Pioneer Mill near Ayr in 1875, and in 1881 a  tramway network had been established to service CSR Homebush and Victoria mills. The Herbert mill had an  network by 1882, and further tram networks were established as the sugar industry expanded, all  gauge with the exception of the Pioneer Mill system.

In 1911 the Queensland Railway Department built a tramway from Chinchilla to Wongongera (now Barakula) to transport railway sleepers made from logs taken from the state forest at Barakula and milled at the Barakula sawmill (approx ). The route of the Barakula tramway was based on an earlier plan to construct a railway line from Chinchilla to Taroom that was subsequently abandoned in favour of a railway line from Miles to Taroom. The tramway operated until 1970.

At the end of World War I surplus equipment that had been used to rail supplies to the trenches was used to expand the sugar cane networks.

Originally cane was harvested by hand, and the ‘standard’ 4 wheel wagon was loaded by stacking the ~2 m lengths of cane between upright stakes.

In the 1950s mechanical harvesting was introduced, and cane ‘bins’ were required to hold the ~200 mm lengths (‘billets’) of cane produced by that harvesting process. Most cane bins are 4 wheel with a 4-6 tonne capacity, but some mills utilise bogie bins with a capacity of ~10 tonnes.

Diesel mechanical and diesel hydraulic locomotives replaced steam locomotives in the 1950s and 1960s. Cane must be processed within 12 hours of harvest for maximum yield, so the transportation timing dictated the size of a cane tramway network when mills were first established. When diesel locomotives were introduced, their increased utilisation rates enabled the size of a potential network to grow, resulting in the rationalisation of both the tramways and a reduction in the number of mills. Today some of the ‘main lines’ of tramways are of a standard equivalent to a  gauge main line, with (in some cases) concrete sleepers, ballast and heavy rail allowing relatively high speed transport of the cane from further distances whilst still meeting the 12-hour ‘delivery from harvest’ timeframe.

Queensland Railways sold a closed branchline in 1964 to the Gin Gin Cooperative Mill in Gin Gin which converted it to a  sugar tramway.

With the development of higher standard road networks, some mills have converted to road transport for some or (in a few cases) all cane delivery.

Nambour, about 100 km north of Brisbane had a sugar tram network until 2003, when the mill closed due to plantations being sold for urban development reducing the district crop harvest to an unviable size.
The Rocky Point Mill situated about 50 km south of Brisbane had a  tramway which opened in 1924 and closed following flood damage in 1951. Road transport has been used for that mill since then.

Current situation

In 2014 there were 19 sugar cane systems (18 of which use  gauge) with a combined trackage of  hauling approximately 36M tonnes of sugar cane each season. The average distance cane is hauled is 35 km, with the longest line being 119 km. Average speed is 40 km/h (due to the wagons not having brakes), and the maximum load is 2000 tonnes, being 1 km long.

It is understood the Pioneer Mill is considering converting its network to  gauge to enable it to more easily procure rolling stock and to facilitate greater efficiency of operations with two neighbouring mills, which currently share 25 km of dual gauge track.

Contemporary sugar cane tramways are quite advanced technically, utilising relatively heavy rails cascaded second hand from other operators, remote-controlled brake vans, concrete sleepers (in places), ballast and tamping machines. The 19 separate tramways cooperate in research and development.

Rolling stock

Passenger

TransLink

 
For TransLink services as far as Gympie North, Queensland Rail's rolling stock is electric and air-conditioned.

 Electric Multiple Units (EMU) – 88 three car units introduced from 1979, now being phased out as a result of the introduction of 700 series
 Suburban Multiple Units (SMU)
 200 Series (SMU200) – 11 in service (12 built)
 220 Series (SMU220) – 30 in service (30 built)
 260 Series (SMU260) – 36 in service (36 built)
 Interurban Multiple Units (IMU)
 100 Series (IMU100) – 10 in service (10 built)
 120 Series (IMU120) – 4 in service (4 built)
 160 Series (IMU160) – 28 in service (28 built)
 700 Series (Also known as NGR) - 75 six car units when delivery is completed, operating on both Interurban and suburban routes.
 InterCity Express (ICE) – 8 two car units plus 4 trailers  (20 cars in total) introduced in 1988.

All trains are electric multiple units with a driver cabin at both ends, with the exception of EMU60 through to EMU79 (now all withdrawn) which had a driver's cab at one end, and guard only cab at the other end. These units also had only 3 powered bogies (per 3 car set) compared to the 4 powered bogie arrangement for the remaining EMUs. The 1X0 and 2X0 series units consist of three cars each, while the 700 series are 6 car units.

The 700 series, built in India, suffered from a design fault for disability access. Due to the rejection of an exemption application to the Australian Human Rights Commission, rectification work was required involving the fitting of a second toilet that met the Disability Discrimination Act 1992 requirements.

Long-distance services

Long-distance services are operated by Traveltrain, a division of Queensland Rail. Traveltrain services mainly cater to a tourist market.
 Tilt Trains
The Electric Tilt Train operating from Brisbane to Rockhampton
The Spirit of Queensland, a Diesel Tilt Train operating from Brisbane to Cairns which replaced The Sunlander, a locomotive hauled train that was withdrawn in 2014.
Locomotive hauled trains
The Spirit of the Outback operating from Brisbane to Longreach. When introduced in 1993, it combined two previous trains, the Capricornian and The Midlander.
The Inlander operating from Townsville to Mount Isa
The Westlander operating from Brisbane to Charleville
Tourist Trains
The Gulflander, a rail motor operating on the Normanton to Croydon line
The Kuranda Scenic Railway operating from Cairns to Kuranda
The Savannahlander, a rail motor operating from Cairns to Forsayth

History
Queensland's first premier passenger service was the Sydney Mail, introduced in 1888 when the New South Wales line opened to Wallangarra. From 1923 it included a Parlour Car, which was transferred to the Townsville Mail in 1930 following the opening of the  line to Brisbane from Sydney.

In 1935 the Sunshine Express was introduced on the Brisbane – Cairns service, being the first completely roller-bearing equipped train in Australia.

The Inlander was the first train in Australia with air-conditioned sleeping cars.

Rail Ambulances
Rail Ambulances, possibly unique to Queensland, operated from 1918-1990. More detail is provided in this article.

Locomotives

Steam
A list of QR steam locomotives is contained here

Diesel
A list of QR diesel locomotives is contained here

Electric
A list of electric locomotives operating in Queensland is contained here

See also

Rail transport in South East Queensland
Rail transport in Australia

References

External links

Queensland Rail
History of Queensland Rail